Baile na nGall (Irish, meaning "town of the foreigners), unofficially anglicized as "Ballydavid", is a Gaeltacht village in the Ard na Caithne region of the Dingle Peninsula of County Kerry, Ireland. As the 2003 Official Languages Act revoked the status of the English language name Ballydavid, the official name is Baile na nGall.

The village is near to Gallarus Castle, a 15th-century tower built by the Knight of Kerry, the holder of a hereditary knighthood belonging to the Geraldine Dynasty.  It is now an Irish heritage site and stands about one kilometre from the better known and more historically significant Gallarus Oratory.

RTÉ Raidió na Gaeltachta has a broadcast studio in Ballydavid.  The radio tower is also a transmission site for RTÉ Network Limited.

The Marilyn, Ballydavid Head, has a relative height of 247 metres.

See also
List of towns and villages in Ireland

References

Gaeltacht places in County Kerry
Gaeltacht towns and villages
Towns and villages in County Kerry